James Wood Bouldin (1792March 30, 1854) was an American U.S. Representative from Virginia, and brother of Thomas Tyler Bouldin.

Biography
Born in Charlotte County, Virginia, Bouldin attended the common schools, then studied law.
He was admitted to the bar April 12, 1813, and began to practice at Charlotte Court House, Virginia.
He served as member of state house of delegates from 1825 to 1826.

Bouldin was elected as a Jacksonian to the Twenty-third Congress to fill the vacancy caused by the death of his brother Thomas Bouldin.
He was reelected to the Twenty-fourth Congress, then as a Democrat to the Twenty-fifth Congress.
He served in Congress from March 15, 1834, to March 3, 1839.
He served as chairman of the Committee on District of Columbia (Twenty-fifth Congress), and opposed the abolition of slavery in the District of Columbia on the grounds that slaves were "freer, happier, and more intelligent, and more pious" than they would have been as free people in Africa.

Following his departure from Congress, possibly due to alcoholism, he resumed the practice of law and also engaged in agricultural pursuits.
He died at his country home, "Forest Hill," Charlotte County, Virginia, March 30, 1854.
He was interred in the private burial ground on his estate.

Elections

1835; Bouldin was re-elected with 58.98% of the vote, defeating Whig Philip A. Bolling.
1837; Bouldin was re-elected unopposed.

References

Sources

1792 births
1854 deaths
Virginia lawyers
Jacksonian members of the United States House of Representatives from Virginia
19th-century American politicians
Democratic Party members of the United States House of Representatives from Virginia
People from Charlotte County, Virginia
American slave owners